Tolga Çevik (born 12 May 1974) is a Turkish actor, most known from the hit films "Organize İşler", Vizontele and the hit series Avrupa Yakası, improvisation theatre "Tolgshow".

Life and career 

His grandparents were among the Turkish population who immigrated from Thessaloniki, Greece, to Turkey after the Ottoman Empire collapsed. He graduated from the theatre department of Central Missouri State University. He was a student of Robin Williams and Tommy Lee Jones.

Personal life 
He is married to Özge Yılmaz, sister of comedian Cem Yılmaz. Actor Sarp Bozkurt is his cousin, with whom he performed together in some seasons of improvisation theatre Tolgshow.

He has a daughter and a son.

Theatre work

 Bana Bir Şeyhler Oluyor
 Sen Beni Sevmiyorsun ! - Edi
 Kalbin Sesi - Bob
 Kelebekler Özgürdür
 Kelebekler Özgürdür - Can
 Küheylan - Alan Strang

Filmography

Film 

 2000 - Herkes Kendi Evinde - Selim
 2000 - Vizontele - Nafiz
 2003 - Vizontele Tuuba - Nafiz
 2004 - Hızlı Adımlar
 2004 - Sevinçli Haller
 2005 - Organize İşler - Süpermen Samet
 2012 - Sen Kimsin? - Tekin Yüksek
 2013 - Patron Mutlu Son İstiyor
 2016 - Sen Benim HerȘeymsin

TV series 

 1996 - Feride - Ali
 1998 - Salacak Öyküleri
 2002 - Aşk ve Gurur - Savaş Timur
 2003 - Esir Şehrin İnsanları
 2003 - Ölümsüz Aşk - Tahsin
 2004 - Kuş Dışı - İskender
 2004 - Avrupa Yakası - Sacit Kıral
 2004 - Herşey Yolunda - Başar
 2007 - Komedi Dükkanı
 2014 - Arkadaşım Hoşgeldin
 2016 - Müdür N'aptin
 2017–2018 - Tolgshow
 2021– - Tolgshow Filtresiz

Awards 
 Secrets - Best supporting actor Award (New York)
 I Am In America - Best Film, Best actor Award (Acedemycal (Fransa), National Film Fair Of B.F.A, California S.U)
 Marriage - CMSU Best Film ve Talent Award
 Terra Nova - Best Supporting Actor Award 
 Hey God - Best actor Award
 Help Me! - Best actor Award
 Help Me! - Best B.F.A Story Award
 Jacques & The Master - Best actor Award
 Küheylan - Avni Dilligil Special Award (1996-1997)
 Küheylan - Stern Magazine Young Talent Award
 Küheylan - Vasfi Rıza Zobu Youth Award
 Vizontele - Çağdaş Cinema Actors Association Special Award (2000-2001)
 Herkes Kendi Evinde - Çağdaş Cinema Actors Association Special Award (2000-2001)
 Organize İşler - Sadri Alışık Best actor Award (2005)
 Golden Butterfly Awards)) - Best Comedian (2011)
 Golden Butterfly Awards - Best Show Program  - Komedi Dükkanı (2008)
 Media Oscars - Best Comedian (2007-2008)
 Media Oscars - Best Show Program - Komedi Dükkanı  (2008-2009)
 Samsun University I.OMÜ awards Best Talk Show - Komedi Dükkanı (2010-2011)
 Marmara University Math Club Awards - Best Comedian Award (2010-2011)
 2nd Antalya Television Awards - Best Comedy Program Komedi Dükkanı (2011)
 Golden Butterfly Awards - Best Comedian Actor Award 2011
 Kadir Has University - Best Comedian Actor Award 2011
 Kahramanmaraş Sütçü İmam University 1. Yılın Kahramanları - Best Hero Comedian Award 2011
 Yıldız Technical University Yılın Yıldızları - Best Theatre Actor Award - 2012

References

External links 
 Official website
 

Turkish male stage actors
Turkish male film actors
Turkish male television actors
Turkish stand-up comedians
1974 births
Male actors from Istanbul
Living people
University of Central Missouri alumni